Eulimella vanderlandi is a species of sea snail, a marine gastropod mollusk in the family Pyramidellidae, the pyrams and their allies.

The epithet "vanderlandi" refers to  Dr J. van der Land at the Nationaal Natuurhistorisch Museum, Leiden, The Netherlands.

Description
The size of the shell varies between 2 mm and 2.7 mm. The slender, whitish shell has a conical shape with a vague spiral microsculpture. The teleoconch consists of five to six flat whorls. The suture between them is moderately incised. The outer lip is straight, lacking teeth. There is no umbilicus.

Distribution
This species occurs in the following locations:
 Cape Verdes, found at depths between 166 m and 179 m.

References

External links
 To Encyclopedia of Life
 To World Register of Marine Species

vanderlandi
Gastropods described in 2000
Gastropods of Cape Verde